Holod may refer to:

Kholod (Russian: Холод), a Russian supersonic rocket
Holod (river), a tributary of the Crișul Negru in Bihor County, Romania
Holod, Bihor, a commune in Bihor County, Romania